This is a list of Mesoamerican pyramids or ceremonial structures. In most cases they are not true pyramids.  There are hundreds of these done in many different styles throughout Mexico and Central America. These were made by several pre-Columbian cultures including the Olmecs, Maya, Toltecs, and Aztecs. In most cases they were made by city states that created many structures in the same style. The style for each city state is usually different. These are usually made out of stone and mortar but some of the earliest may have been made out of clay.

External links

 Locogringo.com: Pyramids
 Amazing Temples and Pyramids - Getting Around

Mesoamerican pyramids
Mesoamerican pyramids
Mesoamerican pyramids

Pyramids, Mesoamerican